Barely Legal may refer to:

National Lampoon's Barely Legal, a 2003 film starring Erik von Detten
Barely Legal (film), a 2011 direct-to-video sex comedy film
Barely Legal (album), a 1997 album by The Hives
"Barely Legal", a song by The Strokes from the 2001 album Is This It
"Barely Legal" (Family Guy), a 2006 episode of the American animated sitcom Family Guy
ECW Barely Legal, a pay-per-view event promoted by Extreme Championship Wrestling in April 1997
Barely Legal (magazine), pornographic magazine
Barely Legal (Banksy), a show by graffiti artist Banksy